The Negros Oriental Provincial Board is the Sangguniang Panlalawigan (provincial legislature) of the Philippine province of Negros Oriental.

The members are elected via three provincial board districts, coextensive with the legislative districts of Negros Oriental, each sending three members to the provincial board; the electorate votes for three members, with the three candidates with the highest number of votes being elected. The Vice Governor of Negros Oriental is the ex officio presiding officer, elected with the Governor. As ex officio presiding officer, he only votes to break ties.

District apportionment

List of members
An additional three ex officio members are the presidents of the provincial chapters of the Association of Barangay Captains, the Councilors' League, the Sangguniang Kabataan
provincial president; the municipal and city (if applicable) presidents
of the Association of Barangay Captains, Councilor's League and Sangguniang Kabataan, shall elect amongst themselves their provincial presidents which shall be their representatives at the board.

Vice Governor

1st District
City: Canlaon, Guihulngan City
Municipalities: Ayungon, Bindoy, Jimalalud, La Libertad, Manjuyod, Tayasan, Vallehermoso
Population (2015): 422,208

2nd District
City: Bais, Dumaguete, Tanjay
Municipalities: Amlan, Mabinay, Pamplona, San Jose, Sibulan
Population (2015): 508,152

3rd District
City: Bayawan
Municipalities: Bacong, Basay, Dauin, Santa Catalina, Siaton, Valencia, Zamboanguita
Population (2015): 424,635

Past members

Vice Governors

1st District Board Members

2nd District Board Members

3rd District Board Members

See also
 Negros Occidental Provincial Board

References

Provincial boards in the Philippines
Politics of Negros Oriental